T. silvestrii may refer to:
 Tapinoma silvestrii, Wheeler, 1928, an ant species in the genus Tapinoma
 Taracus silvestrii, Roewer, 1930, a harvestman species in the genus Taracus and the family Sabaconidae living in caves in the United States

See also
 Silvestrii (disambiguation)